The following units and commanders fought in the Battle of Brandy Station of the American Civil War on the Union side. The Confederate order of battle is shown separately. Order of battle compiled from the army organization during the battle.

Abbreviations used

Military rank
 BG = Brigadier General
 Col = Colonel
 Ltc = Lieutenant Colonel
 Maj = Major
 Cpt = Captain
 Lt = Lieutenant

Other
 w = wounded
 mw = mortally wounded
 k = killed in action
 c = captured

Cavalry Corps, Army of the Potomac

BG Alfred Pleasonton

Right Wing
BG John Buford

Left Wing
BG David McM. Gregg

Notes

References
 The Battle of Brandy Station
 U.S. War Department, The War of the Rebellion: a Compilation of the  Official Records of the Union and Confederate Armies. Washington, DC: U.S. Government Printing Office, 1880–1901.

American Civil War orders of battle